Acrodon caespitosus, the Potberg tiptoothfig, is a species of mesemb from South Africa.

Description 
This succulent plant forms big and low cushion-shaped shrubs. It has only a tap root, with no adventitious roots. The internodes are long, orange-yellow and spongy and have two prominent lateral folds. Like with the plant, these are the biggest in the genus. There are three to twelve teeth on the keel and no teeth (or sometimes between one and three teeth) on the leaf margins. The leaf sheaths are persistent and turn black with age.

Solitary flowers are borne on stems. The bracteoles reach the calyx and embrace the base of the flower.  The calyx lobes are longer than the petals in younger flowers. The flower has a short cone morphology, similar to those of Acrodon bellidiflorus and Acrodon subulatus. The central cone has about 300 stamens with few or no filamentous staminodes. They have long basal papillae that point inwards and interweave to form a felt-like layer. The 45-55 petals are white or pink with a purple stripe and purple margins.

The fruits are borne above the plant on  stalks. The stalks bend upwards, allowing them to receive rainwater when they are open. The lens-shaped closing body splits with pressure. While the long stem holding the fruit may sway due to the pressure from raindrops, wind dispersal is unlikwly as the seeds sticl together when wet. The capsule closes again when dry, reopening upon the next rain event.

Distribution and habitat 
Acrodon caespitosus is endemic to the Western Cape of South Africa. It grows near the mouth of the Breede River, near Swellendam. This area consists of shrubby coastal fynbos that receives rain all year round. It grows on limestone or in sandy patches.

Conservation 
While the risk of extinction for this species has not officially been assessed, it is known that the species living in its habitat are threatened by invasive species, including Acacia cyclops and Acacia longifolia.

References 

Plants described in 2012
Flora of South Africa